Wexler  may refer to:

 Wexler (surname), including a list of people with the name
 Mount Wexler, United States
 Wexler (crater), lunar impact crater

See also 
 Wechsler (disambiguation)